Aldrich Bay, named after Major Edward Aldrich, was formerly a bay in the north shore on the Hong Kong Island, Hong Kong. It is now reclaimed and is a housing area outside the area of Shau Kei Wan, neighbouring A Kung Ngam and Lei King Wan.

Outside Aldrich Bay, it is the Shau Kei Wan Typhoon Shelter. It is not a small community. It contains Oi Tung Estate, Tung Yuk Court, Aldrich Garden and other private housings, with several primary school and secondary school. It is administratively part of the Eastern District.

Name
The Chinese transcription for "Aldrich" roughly means "Loving Discipline", matching the achievement of Major Aldrich that bringing good discipline to his force.

Education
Primary School:
CCC Kei Wan Primary School (Aldrich Bay)
Aldrich Bay Government Primary School
Secondary School:
St. Mark's School
Munsang College (Hong Kong Island)

See also
List of places in Hong Kong

References

Bays of Hong Kong
Shau Kei Wan